Tinguiririca may refer to:

Tinguiririca, Chile
Tinguiririca fauna
Tinguiririca River
Tinguiririca (volcano)

See also
Uruguayan Air Force Flight 571 near Tinguiririca (volcano)